The Rebel is a 1915 Australian silent film starring Allen Doone.

It is considered a lost film.

Plot
Irish rebel leader Jack Blake is arrested and thrown into gaol by vindictive Englishman Captain Armstrong. Jack's girlfriend, Eileen, helps him escape and he kills Armstrong in a duel. Jack and Eileen flee to France.

Cast
Allen Doone as Jack Blake
Edna Keeley as Eileen McDermott
Frank Cullinane as Squire McDermott
Onslow Edgeworth as Captain Armstrong
Percy Kehoe as Father Kelly

Production
This film was based on a stage show which had been performed on stage since November 1913 by Allen Doone.

Raymond Longford claimed he was meant to direct the film but that Australasian Films would not let the producers rent out their Rushcutters Bay Studio with Longford attached; he was replaced by American John Matthews.

It was shot in and around Sydney over six weeks from April to May 1915. The movie only received limited distribution.

References

External links
 
The Rebel at National Film and Sound Archive

Australian black-and-white films
1915 films
1915 drama films
Australian drama films
Australian silent feature films
Lost Australian films
1915 lost films
Lost drama films
Silent drama films